Ancistrus macrophthalmus is a species of catfish in the family Loricariidae. It is native to South America, where it occurs in the Orinoco River and its lower tributaries in Venezuela. The species reaches 7.9 cm (3.1 inches) SL. It is occasionally seen in the aquarium trade, where it is one of multiple species sometimes referred to as "medusa plecos".

References 

macrophthalmus
Fish described in 1912
Fish of South America